Tyron Buddah Douglas Sr. (born February 8, 1992), professionally known as Buddah Bless, is an American record producer, songwriter, and former rapper. He has produced many hit singles, such as "Big Amount" by 2 Chainz (featuring Drake), "Make No Sense" by YoungBoy Never Broke Again, "Out West" by JackBoys, Travis Scott, and Young Thug, with the most notable song being "Heat" by Chris Brown (featuring Gunna) peaking at number 36 on the Billboard Hot 100.

His production works can be identified by his producer tag, "Buddah Bless this beat", usually appearing in beginnings of songs produced by him.

Early life 
Douglas was born in Long Island, New York, on February 8, 1992. He was raised in Atlanta, Georgia. He is 1 of 5 children (his siblings are: Tracy Douglas, Kelley Douglas, Tychaune Douglas, and Kiana Randolph). His mother, Cheryl Dessaure, was a registered nurse and his father, Albie Douglas, was a photographer and graphic designer. Douglas began his music life in church. He used to play piano alongside his brother who played the drums. One Thanksgiving he saw his uncle making beats. With the combination of those things his music career began.

Career 
Douglas has produced hit singles by artists such as Migos, Chris Brown, Travis Scott, and more.

Artistry 
Douglas has described his style as "your grandmother's music mixed with Gucci Mane".

Production discography

Charted songs

Notes

References

1992 births
Musicians from Atlanta
People from Long Island
Musicians from New York (state)
Record producers from New York (state)
Record producers from Georgia (U.S. state)
American hip hop record producers
21st-century American musicians
Living people